David F. Schrader (born October 23, 1952) is an American politician in the state of Iowa.

Schrader was born in Jasper County, Iowa. A Democrat, he served in the Iowa House of Representatives from 1987 to 2003 (69th district from 1987 to 1993 and 90th district from 1993 to 2003).

References

1952 births
Living people
People from Jasper County, Iowa
Businesspeople from Iowa
Democratic Party members of the Iowa House of Representatives
20th-century American politicians
21st-century American politicians